"El Último Beso" ("The Last Kiss") is the title of a song written and produced by Mexican singer-songwriter Joan Sebastian and recorded by Mexican performer Vicente Fernández. It was first included on Fernández' 79th studio album Para Siempre and then recorded live for his live album Primera Fila where it was released as the first single.

Song information
"El Último Beso" was recorded and included on the 79th studio album by Vicente Fernández titled Para Siempre. Two years later was included on the set list for Fernández' live album Primera Fila. This performance was labeled as a "highlight of the show" by Jason Birchmeier of Allmusic. It was later released as the first single from this album.

Chart performance
This song debuted on the Billboard Latin Regional Mexican Airplay chart in December 2008 at number 26, and peaked at number one ten weeks later. On the Billboard Hot Latin Songs chart peaked at number 1, giving Fernandez his first chart-topping single. With this single, Fernández, at 68, became the oldest performer to peak at number-one on this chart.

Charts

Personnel
The following people contributed to the original version of "El Último Beso":

Joan Sebastían — Guitar, arranger, producer
Miguel Trujillo — Executive producer
Dennis Parker — Engineer/mixer, mastering engineer
Rigoberto Alfaro — Arranger
Manuel Cázarez — Arranger
Mara Esquivel — A&R
Javier Alfaro — Violin

Dave Rivera — Violin
Javier Carrillo — Violin
Hugo Colula — Violin
Francisco Cedillo — Viola
Monica Del Aguila — Cello
Bernardino De Santiago — Guitarrón
Moisés Garcia — Trumpet

References 

Songs about kissing
Songs about parting
2008 singles
2009 singles
Vicente Fernández songs
Spanish-language songs
Songs written by Joan Sebastian
2008 songs
Sony BMG Norte singles